Compsodrillia excentrica is a species of sea snail, a marine gastropod mollusk in the family Pseudomelatomidae, the turrids and allies.

Description
The length of the shell attains 28.3 mm.

Distribution
This species occurs in the Pacific Ocean between Mexico and Panama; also off the Galapagos Islands (of doubtful occurrence)

References

  Proceedings of the Zoological Society of London pt. 9-11 (1841-1843)

External links
 
 
 Additions to the Panamic Province gastropod (Mollusca) literature, 1971 to 1992; The Festivus vol. 24 suppl. 1992
  K.L. Kaiser,The recent molluscan marine fauna of the Islas Galápagos; The Festivus v. 29 suppl. 1997

excentrica
Gastropods described in 1834